"Christopher White" is #108 of the Child Ballads, the collection of 305 ballads from England and Scotland, and their American variants, collected by Francis James Child in the late nineteenth century. The collection was published as The English and Scottish Popular Ballads between 1882 and 1898 by Houghton Mifflin in ten volumes.

Synopsis
A maid bemoans the absence of her lover, Christopher White.  A merchant offers to marry her instead.  She tells him that if she was false to her lover, she'd be false to him.  He offers more and more until he persuades her.  She marries him, sends a letter to her lover with money, and when he comes, runs off with him and much of the merchant's treasure.  The merchant laments, but acknowledges that she told him she would be false to him if she were false to her lover.

See also 
List of the Child Ballads

References

External links
Christopher White

Child Ballads
Houghton Mifflin books
Year of song unknown
Songwriter unknown